The Hermitage Dam is a concrete gravity dam on the Wag Water River near Stony Hill in Saint Andrew Parish, Jamaica. The primary purpose of the dam is to provide municipal water to nearby Kingston and Saint Andrew Parish. Construction on the dam began in 1924 and it was inaugurated on 4 May 1927. It is owned by the National Water Commission.

See also
Rio Cobre Dam

References

Dams in Jamaica
Dams completed in 1927
Buildings and structures in Saint Andrew Parish, Jamaica